The following is a list of governors of the Panama Canal Zone while it was under U.S. control.

Military governors (1904–1914)

Military and civil governors (1914–1924)

Civil governors (1924–1979)

See also
Panama Canal Zone

Notes

External links
World StatesmenPanama (Canal Zone)

 
Panama Canal Zone
 
Governors of Panama Canal Zone